Alexandr Dolgopolov was the defending champion, but chose not to compete this year.Robin Haase won the final against Ivo Minář 6–4, 6–3.

Seeds

Draw

Finals

Top half

Bottom half

References
Main Draw
Qualifying Singles

Citta di Como Challenger - Singles
Città di Como Challenger